District 20 of the Oregon State Senate comprises parts of Clackamas County and a very small section of Marion County. It is currently represented by Republican Bill Kennemer, a former state lawmaker who was appointed to the position after Alan Olsen of Canby resigned prior to the 2019 session.

Election results
District boundaries have changed over time, therefore, senators before 2013 may not represent the same constituency as today. From 1993 until 2003, the district covered parts of the Eugene metropolitan area, and from 2003 until 2013 it covered a slightly different area in the southern Portland metropolitan area.

References

20
Clackamas County, Oregon
Marion County, Oregon